Khumujam Tombi Devi is an Indian judoka, who represented her country at the 2008 Summer Olympics in Beijing. She participated in the 48 kg category, but lost to Portugal's Ana Hormigo in the preliminary round.

See also
India at the 2008 Summer Olympics

References

Olympic judoka of India
Judoka at the 2008 Summer Olympics
+Female
Living people
Year of birth missing (living people)
Sportswomen from Manipur
Martial artists from Manipur
Judoka at the 2010 Asian Games
21st-century Indian women
21st-century Indian people
Place of birth missing (living people)
Asian Games competitors for India
Recipients of the Arjuna Award